Kuckhoff is a surname. Notable people with the surname include:

 Adam Kuckhoff (1887–1943), German journalist
 Greta Kuckhoff (1902–1981), East German politician